Norris is an unincorporated community located in Scott County, Mississippi.

References

Unincorporated communities in Scott County, Mississippi
Unincorporated communities in Mississippi